Psittacanthus robustus is a species of Neotropical mistletoe in the family Loranthaceae, which is found in Brazil, Colombia, Guyana, and Venezuela.

Description
Initially, branches are erect, but adult branches are pendulous. Branch cross-sections are square. Leaves are petiolate and obtuse at both base and apex. Inflorescences are both terminal and axillary, consisting of umbels of yellow to orange triads (flowers in groups of three).
The fruit is light green colored when immature but when ripe the colour changes to black, and looks somewhat like an olive. Its seeds have 3 cotyledons and sticky substance inside.

Taxonomy
P. robustus was first described by Martius in 1829 as Loranthus robustus, and in 1830, he assigned it to a new genus Psittacanthus.

Distribution
It has been found in the Northern Amazon, in Brazil North, Brazil Northeast, Brazil Southeast, Brazil West-Central, Colombia, Guyana, and  Venezuela, 
in Amazonian rainforests, Caatinga, the Central Brazilian Savanna, and the Atlantic Rainforest.

Ecology
Three species of birds have been found eating and excreting the seeds.  The most common isTersina viridis viridis (swallow tanager), but also the cinnamon-tanager, Schystoclamys ruficapillus ruficapillus, and the sayaca-tanager, Thraupis sayaca sayaca.

It has been found on thirteen hosts, from the genera Vochysiaceae and Melastomaceae.

References

Further reading
 Bernal, R., Gradstein, R.S. & Celis, M. (eds.) 2016. Catálogo de plantas y líquenes de Colombia 1-2: 1-3068. Libro impreso
 Hokche, O., Berry, P.E. & Huber, O. (eds.) 2008. Nuevo Catálogo de la Flora Vascular de Venezuela. Fundación Instituto Botánico de Venezuela

robustus
Flora of Brazil
Flora of Venezuela
Flora of Guyana
Flora of Colombia
Flora of the Atlantic Forest
Taxa named by Carl Friedrich Philipp von Martius